Rajpura is a small village in Sirmaur District, Himachal Pradesh, India. It is situated in the hills near Bhagani, at a distance of around 20 km from Paonta Sahib.

External links
 See Rajpura on Google Maps

Villages in Sirmaur district